J. R. R. Tolkien: A Biography, written by Humphrey Carpenter, was first published in 1977. It is called the "authorized biography" of J. R. R. Tolkien, creator of The Hobbit and The Lord of the Rings It was first published in London by George Allen & Unwin, then in the United States by Houghton Mifflin Company. It has been reprinted many times since.

Reception

The Tolkien scholar Tom Shippey writes that even though the biography came out before most of the posthumous publications edited by Christopher Tolkien, "it has worn very well", telling of Tolkien's "sad and traumatic youth", and providing good coverage of his dealings with C. S. Lewis and his publishers. The book was reviewed by August J. Fry for Christianity & Literature. Anthea Lawson reviewed the book for The Observer in 2002.

Charles E. Lloyd reviewed the book for the Sewanee Review in 1978, writing that Carpenter "reveals an affecting remarkable life without interposing between reader and subject personal predilections or self-advertisement." Lloyd states that the effect is to present Tolkien as a "very ordinary, even obscure, professor". He cites, too, Carpenter's mention that Tolkien "disapproved of biography as an aid to literary appreciation", agreeing that this may have been correct, with the two famous works telling what readers most need to know about Tolkien, but adding that it is helpful to know that Tolkien liked ordinary working men, like the batmen who served officers in the First World War trenches. Lloyd finds Carpenter's account of Tolkien's youth "gripping and astounding", and extremely good on his friendships and Catholicism.

References

External links 
 Editions of J. R. R. Tolkien: A Biography available on the Internet Archive

Tolkien studies
1977 books
British biographies
Allen & Unwin books